The Immortals (German Die Unsterblichen) was a neo-Nazi organization based in Germany that uses flash mobs to coordinate, gather and demonstrate. The members wear black clothing with white facial masks and carry torches when they march.

See also
 White nationalism
 White supremacy

References

Neo-Nazi organizations
Neo-Nazism in Germany
Racism in Germany